Brian Dabul and Leonardo Mayer were the defending champions; however, Dabul chose to compete in Manta instead and Mayer chose to compete in Rome instead.
Jeff Coetzee and Kristof Vliegen won in the final 7–6(7–3), 6–3, against James Cerretani and Adil Shamasdin.

Seeds

Draw

Draw

External Links
 Doubles Draw

Tunis Open - Doubles
2010 Doubles